Mahmoud Ouertani is a Tunisian football manager.

References

Year of birth missing (living people)
Living people
Tunisian football managers
ES Hammam-Sousse managers
ES Métlaoui managers
Club Athlétique Bizertin managers
Stade Tunisien managers
JS Kairouan managers